The 2019 KML Play-offs was the tournament to determine the Korvpalli Meistriliiga champions for the 2018–19 season. This season saw the introduction of the Estonian-Latvian Basketball League, replacing the KML regular season, with the top six Estonian teams advancing to the KML play-offs. The play-offs began on 9 April and concluded on 22 May with Kalev/Cramo defeating Tallinna Kalev/TLÜ 3 games to 0 in the finals to win their 11th Estonian Championship.

Teams

Venues and locations

Personnel and sponsorship

Play-off bracket

Quarter-finals
The quarter-finals are best-of-five series.

Tartu Ülikool vs. Tallinna Kalev/TLÜ

Avis Utilitas Rapla vs. Pärnu Sadam

Semi-finals
The semi-finals are best-of-five series.

Kalev/Cramo vs. Pärnu Sadam

TalTech vs. Tallinna Kalev/TLÜ

Third place games
The third place games are best-of-five series.

TalTech vs. Pärnu Sadam

Finals
The finals are best-of-five series.

Kalev/Cramo vs. Tallinna Kalev/TLÜ

Awards

Finals Most Valuable Player
 Branko Mirković (Kalev/Cramo)

Best Young Player
 Arnas Velička (Tartu Ülikool)

Best Defender
 Mihkel Kirves (Pärnu Sadam)

Newcomer of the Year
 Martin Müürsepp (Tallinna Kalev/TLÜ)

Coach of the Year
 Donaldas Kairys (Kalev/Cramo)

All-KML Team

References

External links

Korvpalli Meistriliiga playoffs
2019 KML Play-offs